Jan Hadek (born 4 September 1945) is a former speedway rider from Czechoslovakia.

Speedway career
Hadek partnered Jan Holub I to the World Pairs final at the 1974 Speedway World Pairs Championship.

World Final appearances

World Pairs Championship
 1974 –  Manchester, Hyde Road (with Jan Holub I) – 7th – 6pts (3)

References

1945 births
Living people
Czech speedway riders